The 2012–13 Iraq FA Cup was the 26th edition of the Iraq FA Cup as a clubs-only competition, the main domestic cup in Iraqi football. It was the first edition held since the 2002–03 season.

The tournament was cancelled during the Round of 32 because of scheduling difficulties the Iraq Football Association had with the 2012–13 Iraqi Elite League.

Format

Participation 
The cup starts with a qualifying round of 13 teams from the Iraq Division One, 12 of which play against each other and one of which proceeds to the playoff round. The playoff round gets played between three teams from Division One and one from the Iraqi Premier League. The other 17 teams of the Iraqi Premier League and the rest of Division One join the other teams in the Round of 32.

Draw 
For the first round, the participating teams will be split into two pots of 6 teams in one and 7 in the other. For the remaining rounds other than the final, the draw will be conducted from just one pot. The final is held in the Al-Shaab Stadium, a nominally neutral venue.

Match rules 
Teams meet in one game in the first round. In the playoff round, Round of 32, 16 and the quarterfinals, the teams will have two-legged ties. The semifinals and the final will have only one-legged ties. A match will take place for 90 minutes, with two halves of 45 minutes. If still tied after regulation or tied on aggregate, 30 minutes of extra time will be played, consisting of two periods of 15 minutes. If the score is still level after this, the match will be decided by a penalty shootout. A coin toss will decide who takes the first penalty.

Cards 
If a player receives a second yellow card, they will be banned from the next cup match. If a player receives a red card, they will be banned a minimum of one match, but more can be added by the Iraq Football Association.

Participating clubs 
The following 40 teams qualified for the competition:

Bold: indicated teams are still in competition

Map

Schedule 
The rounds of the 2012–13 competition are scheduled as follows:

Matches 
Times from the start of the first round, on 28 September 2012, until the end of the second round, on 10 June 2013, are in AST (UTC+03:00).

First round

Play-off round

First legs

Second legs

Second round

First legs

Second legs

Bracket 
The following is the bracket which the Iraq FA Cup resembled from the Round of 32 onwards. Teams that are bolded advanced on.

References

External links
 Iraq Football Association

Iraq FA Cup
Cup
Iraq FA Cup